The coat of arms of the Czech Republic is divided into two principal variants. Greater coat of arms displays the three historical regions—the Czech lands—which make up the nation. Lesser coat of arms displays lone silver double-tailed lion in red shield. The current coats of arms, which was adopted in 1992, was designed by Czech heraldist Jiří Louda.

Background

The arms of Bohemia show a silver double-tailed lion on a red background. This Bohemian Lion makes up the first and the fourth quarters of the greater coat of arms, so it is repeated in the shield. The Moravian red-and-silver chequered eagle is shown on a blue background. Between 1915 and 1918 the Moravian Eagle was chequered in the red-and-gold colors. The arms of Silesia are a black eagle with the so-called "clover stalk" (lat. perisonium) in her breast on a golden background, although only a small south-eastern part of the historical region (Czech Silesia) belongs to the Czech Republic (the main part is now in Poland).

The rulers of Bohemia originally bore for arms a so-called St. Wenceslas flaming eagle. In the 12th century, Emperor Frederick granted new arms to King Vladislaus II consisting of a silver lion on a red field, to symbolise his valor. The lion was at first represented with one tail. Later a second tail was added, for the help provided by the King Přemysl Otakar I fighting the Saxons (Beware - this is just a legend (from Dalimil's chronicle)). During the first half of the 13th century the kings of Bohemia used a coat of arms bearing a black eagle in a silver shield. Red gonfanons had appeared earlier. From 1253 a two-tailed silver lion in a red field had been the coat of arms of the Kingdom of Bohemia. This lion was originally a sign of the Moravian margraves.

The oldest surviving full color depiction of the arms of Bohemia appears in the Passional of Abbes Cunegund from the 1310s. The Moravian Eagle was first documented on the seal of Ottokar's uncle, Margrave Přemysl (d. 1239). The Silesian Eagle stems from the ruling dynasty of the Piasts and was first applied by Duke Henry II the Pious (1238-1241). The shields also appeared on the emblems of the Crown of Bohemia established by Emperor Charles IV.

The greater shield was also used as the badge for the Czech national ice hockey team until 2018. The Czech national football team also featured it in their shirts, until being replaced with a newer, more streamlined badge featuring only the Bohemian lion, since the UEFA Euro 2012.

Variants

Greater version
The greater coat of arms is blazoned in Czech law as follows:

A shield quartered: first and fourth gules, a lion rampant queue forchée argent armed, langued and crowned Or; second azure, an eagle displayed chequé gules and argent armed, langued and crowned Or; third Or, an eagle displayed sable armed and langued gules crowned of the field and charged on the breast with a crescent terminating in trefoils at each end with issuing from the centrepoint a cross patée argent.

Lesser version
The lesser coat of arms is blazoned in Czech law:

The lesser national coat of arms is a red shield, in it a silver double-tailed lion rampant with golden crown and golden armament.

History

Czech lands

Bohemian Crown lands

Lands of the Bohemian Crown

Czechoslovakia

Protectorate of Bohemia and Moravia

Czech Republic

See also 
 Coat of arms of Silesia
Coat of arms of Czechoslovakia
Coat of arms of Moravia
 Armorial of sovereign states

References and external links

National symbols of the Czech Republic
Czech Republic
Czech Republic
Czech Republic
Czech Republic
Czech Republic
Czechia